The term Neustadtl is the German name for:
Nové Mesto nad Váhom in Slovakia
Nové Město na Moravě in the Czech Republic
Novo Mesto in Slovenia

The Neustadtl score is a scoring system often used to break ties in chess tournaments
Neustadtl score